Blea Moor Tunnel is a 2,629 yd (2,404 m) railway tunnel located between Ribblehead Viaduct and Dent railway station in England. It is the longest tunnel on the Settle-Carlisle Line, being almost twice as long as the second longest tunnel, Rise Hill Tunnel.

History

Built by the Midland Railway, it took more than four years to complete. Construction started in 1872, with dynamite transported from Carlisle and Newcastle in carts to the construction site. The wages on offer to the miners who dug the tunnel were 5s to 5s 6d per day.

It was completed in 1875 at a cost of £109,000.

It passes some 500 feet below the moor after which it was named, and was built with the aid of seven separate construction shafts sunk from the moor above.  This permitted sixteen separate gangs of workers to be used during construction (one from each open end and two from the foot of each of the shafts).  Four of these were subsequently filled in but three were retained for ventilation purposes and are still used as such today (with occasional ice accumulation problems). At one point of the track's history, steam locomotives were tested for their worthiness by driving them through this tunnel.  

The line from the south enters the tunnel on a rising 1% (1 in 100) gradient (the "Long Drag" beginning back at ), but an initial summit is reached at the 1100 ft contour just under half a mile from the southern portal.  From there, the rest of the tunnel is on a shallow descending gradient of 1 in 440 towards Dent Head.

Traffic
Any train that goes the full length of the Settle & Carlisle line goes through the Blea Moor Tunnel. This includes passenger trains, all run by Northern (seven each way per day in the 2016-17 timetable), various special excursions (some hauled by steam locomotives) and the many goods trains.

Train simulators 
You can go through the Blea Moor Tunnel either with Microsoft Train Simulator, Trainz Classics 3 or Train Simulator Classic.

Location
Southern portal: 
Northern portal:

References

Railway tunnels in England
Midland Railway
Rail transport in Cumbria
Rail transport in North Yorkshire
Tunnels in Cumbria
Tunnels in North Yorkshire